James P. Crowley Sr. (c.1930 – March 21, 2013) was an American football coach.  He was the head football coach at the Nichols College in Dudley, Massachusetts from 1993 to 1995.

Prio to that, Crowley served as the head coach for one season in 1987 at Bridgewater State College in Bridgewater, Massachusetts.

Head coaching record

References

Bridgewater State Bears football coaches
Nichols Bison football coaches
2013 deaths